Kevin Staniec (born May 4, 1979) is an American writer/publisher. He is an author of children's literature, poetry, essays, fiction, non-fiction and screenplays. He publishes creative magazines, limited edition art journals and project books/catalogs.

Biography
Staniec was born in Chicago, Illinois. His family moved to Southern California where he was raised in Orange County and continues to live.

Staniec graduated from the School of Film and Television at Chapman University in 2001 with a Bachelor of Fine Arts. He received a minor degree from the Department of English with a concentration in Creative Writing.

In 2002 Staniec co-created ISM: a community project, a non-profit organization dedicated to benefiting the youth of society through the artistic enrichment of community. What started as a local printed periodical has developed into an internationally distributed collectible.

Books
Staniec's first book And This Was My Happy Ending was published in the summer of 2006. This narrative short viewed romance from the perspective of a struggling writer with poetic prose and honest emotion. Integrated into the story is a series of polaroids photographed by the author.

With poet/performer Derrick Brown, Staniec co-edited The Good Things About America anthology for Write Bloody Publishing. This book serves as a historical document that uses poetry and prose to explore and celebrate the United States. The cover design features polaroids taken by Staniec.

For his upcoming children's book 'The Special Adventures of Super Bunny and the Great Giant Cat Bear', Staniec has collaborated with artist Patrick Ballesteros.

Staniec is currently completing an illustrated poetry book entitled I am. You Are. with San Francisco-based artist/poet Melanie Moore and Los Angeles-based illustrator Emilio Santoyo.

Projects
Before the holiday season of 2006 Staniec invited a group of artists from around the world to donate paintings and photographs for a fundraising exhibition entitled White Elephant. All proceeds from the benefit event would help support the Children’s Hospital of Orange County. Guests attending the show were asked to donate art supplies for patients of the hospital.

During Autumn of 2007 Staniec began production on the Untitled Love Project, an emotionally influenced experiment examining the broken heart. After two years of touring exhibitions, with over 100 artists revisiting past relationships through their medium, Staniec designed a book highlighting these artistic expressions accompanied with interviews, short stories and journal entries.

His next project was a charity auction entitled SK8OLOGY, with over 150 artists, celebrities and skaters mixing mediums to produce one-of-a-kind, rare skate deck canvases in support of ISM: a community project and Now That You Know. The exhibition opened at the ISM: gallery in Long Beach, shipped to San Diego for the Action Sports Retailer convention and concluded at the Surf Expo in Florida.

In the Summer of 2009, Staniec created a tribute to instant film and the discontinued Polaroid  600 Series with a touring gallery exhibition entitled INSTANT GRATIFICATION: a polaroid party, featuring over 200 professional and amateur photographers from around the world celebrating the historic format. A jury of artists and designers will collaborate to produce a rare retrospective print collectible documenting the INSTANT GRATIFICATION project including personal essays and love letters bidding farewell to instant film.

External links 
 Official Website
 ISM: a community project

References

American children's writers
American male poets
1979 births
Living people
Chapman University alumni
21st-century American poets
21st-century American male writers